Féng is a Chinese surname. It is 9th on in the Song Dynasty Hundred Family Surname poem and is reported as the 31st most common Chinese last name in 2006. Unlike the less common Feng name "phoenix" (fourth tone) it is a rising second tone féng in modern Mandarin.

The character itself, is made up of the character for "Horse" with an ice radical consisting of two strokes to the left that is meant to suggest speed or galloping.

Historical roots 
The surname descended from the 15th son of King Wen of Zhou, Gao the Duke of Bi (畢公高), whose last name was Ji. During the Spring and Autumn period, an official of the Zheng kingdom, Feng Jian Zi was awarded the land of Feng (Henan province). The Jin kingdom besieged Feng and gave it to Wei Zhang Qing. Thus descendants of Wei Zhang Qing also have the last name of Feng.

The surname originates from the southeast of Chang'an in Shaanxi Province.

Variations 
English spelling variations include:
 Feng (Mandarin spelling)
 Fung (Cantonese spelling, originating from China and Hong Kong)
 Foong (Cantonese spelling)
 Fong (Cantonese spelling, originating from Macau)
 Pâng (Originating from Chaozhou and Min Nan)
 풍 (Originating from Korea)

In Vietnam, the surname Phùng was formerly written with the same character.

Notable people with the name Feng
Feng Ba, "Emperor" (king) of the state of Northern Yan
Fung Fung, Hong Kong actor and director
Feng Gong, Chinese Xiangsheng performer
Feng Guozhang, Chinese military officer and politician during Republican China
Feng Hong, last "Emperor" (king) of the state of Northern Yan
Feng Kun, Chinese volleyball player
Feng Ru, first Chinese aviator known to fly in America
Feng Tianwei, China-born Singaporean Olympic table tennis player
Feng Weihua, red notice fugitive
Feng Xiaogang, Chinese film director
Feng Yuxiang, Chinese warlord during Republican China
Feng Xinduo, Member of Chinese girl group SNH48 and the captain of Team NII
Joyce Feng, Minister without Portfolio of the Republic of China
Maggie Feng, American chess player 
Shanshan Feng (born 1989), Chinese golfer
 Feng Jianyu, female Chinese murder victim killed in Singapore

Notable people with the name Fung
William Fung, Hong Kong billionaire businessman, managing director of Li & Fung Group
Margaret Chan Fung Fu-chun, Director-General of the World Health Organization
Frederick Fung, Hong Kong pro-democracy politician
Fung Bo Bo, Hong Kong actress, daughter of Fung Fung
Fung Chin Pang, Hong Kong comic artist
Jim Fung, Hong Kong/Australian martial artist
Lori Fung, Canadian gymnastics coach
David Fung (Chinese: 馮大維), Concert pianist
Cerezo Fung a Wing, Dutch footballer
Mellissa Fung, Canadian journalist
Stephen Fung, Hong Kong actor and director
Victor Fung, Chairman of the Airport Authority Hong Kong
Yuan-Cheng Fung, American scientist, founding figure in bioengineering and biomechanics
Inga DeCarlo Fung Marchand, known as Foxy Brown, American rapper of Trinidadian and Asian ancestry
The Fung Brothers, Comedy YouTubers consisting of David Fung and Andrew Fung

Notable people with the name Pang
 Aloysius Pang (冯伟衷), Singaporean actor, who died on 23 January 2019 while sustaining serious crush injuries while attending SAF reservist training in New Zealand.
 Alvin Pang (Chinese: 冯启明; born 1972, Singapore), Singaporean author

References

Chinese-language surnames
Individual Chinese surnames